Bugs Bunny in Space is a Looney Tunes television special that originally aired on CBS September 6, 1977. Assembled to capitalize on the enormous success of the original Star Wars film in summer 1977, the special is a compilation of clips from science fiction themed Warner Bros. Cartoons, including Duck Dodgers in the 24½th Century.

This is the only Bugs Bunny special not to include any new animation.

Cast
Mel Blanc as Bugs Bunny, Marvin the Martian (referred to as Antwerp), Daffy Duck, and Porky Pig

Plot
Bugs Bunny in Space is a parody of Star Wars (1977) that features a compilation of science-fiction themed clips from Warner Brothers cartoons starring Bugs Bunny and other characters.

Credits
Produced by Hal Geer
Directed by Chuck Jones, Friz Freleng

Cartoons featured
The Hasty Hare
Hare-Way to the Stars
Mad as a Mars Hare
His Hare-Raising Tale
Duck Dodgers in the 24½th Century

Haredevil Hare (Released Prior to August 1948) is not included. Due to being sold to a.a.p. in 1956.

References

External links
 

1977 television specials
1970s American television specials
1970s animated television specials
CBS television specials
Bugs Bunny films
Daffy Duck films
Porky Pig films
Looney Tunes television specials
Television shows directed by Chuck Jones
1970s English-language films
1970s American films